Ain't Nothin' Like Me is the sixth studio album by American recording artist Joe, released by Jive Records after several delays on April 24, 2007 in the United States. The singer worked with several producers on the album, including Bryan Michael Cox, Tim & Bob, Cool & Dre, The Underdogs, and Sean Garrett; rappers Papoose, Nas, Fabolous, Young Buck, and Tony Yayo appear as guest vocalists.

Upon release, Ain't Nothin' Like Me received generally positive reviews from music critics. it debuted at number two on the US Billboard 200 and on top of the Top R&B/Hip Hop Albums chart, selling about 98,000 copies in its first week, while marking his highest-charting album since My Name Is Joe, which reached the same position of both charts.

Background
In 2003, Joe released his fifth studio album And Then. Produced by Joe's labelmate R. Kelly along with Roy "Royalty" Hamilton, Kevin "Shekspere" Briggs, Carvin & Ivan, and others, the album reached number 26 on the US Billboard 200 albums chart, selling 121,000 copies in its first week of release. It produced the R&B top thirty single "More & More" and "Ride wit U" and was eventually certified gold by the Recording Industry Association of America (RIAA).

Soon after, Joe started work on his sixth full-length album. Aiming for a new direction, while maintaining the romantic, gospel-influenced R&B style mixed in hip-hop elements, the singer collaborated with a different range of writers and producers to create the bulk of the album, including Bryan Michael Cox, Cool & Dre, Sean Garrett, The Smith Brothers, and Tim & Bob. Although he co-wrote five songs on the album, Joe decided to leave most of the writing and producing to his collaborators: “I look at what the record ultimately needs [...]It’s about making a great record, not about how many songs I have on the album. A lot of artists get into writing too much, and the album starts to sound the same. I like working with several different producers who can bring their own sound to the record. It gives the album more variety and dimension.” The singer named “If I Was Your Man” and “It’s Me” as two of his favorite songs on the album; both tracks were written by the Norwegian duo Stargate. Commenting on their work, Joe elaborated, that "it was a blast working with [them]. They are doing something great for R&B, creating strong midtempo and uptempo songs and tracks. There’s normally a lot of slow ballads in R&B, but they bring in more uptempo grooves and sounds.”

Critical reception

Upon release, Ain't Nothin' Like Me received generally positive reviews from music critics. Andy Kellman from Allmusic gave the album four stars out of five and wrote that "contemporary as ever, Joe seeks production and songwriting assistance from a number of ubiquitous heavyweights and up-and-comers [...] While a very basic name, a lack of flashiness, and sizeable gaps of inactivity have only gotten in the way of his popularity, Joe has maintained relevant and reliable since he debuted." 
Mark Edward Nero, writing for About.com, felt that with Ain't Nothin' Like Me the singer "doesn't vary much from the tone and image he established for himself on previous albums; there's the same emotional ballads, the same sexy bedroom music, the same obligatory guest appearances by rappers. Joe's approach on the album seems to be if it ain't broke, don't fix it. And the approach works; Ain't Nothing Like Me is a solid, if unspectacular, album that should be appealing to the women and men who are fans of Joe's earlier work." He rated the album three and a half stars out of five.

Laura Checkoway from Vibe felt that the "album, though heavy on cheese, is surprisingly pleasant, especially as there is a deficit right now of true grown-man R&B. Joe stays young with A-list production and rap cameos. Less empathic Entertainment Weeklys Simon Vozick-Levinson wrote that the "album is most entertaining when New York City MCs like Nas and Papoose drop by for lively guest spots. Joe's solo ballads, however, make the disc's title seem like a cruel joke: His voice is consistently easy on the ears, sure, but contemporary R&B is full of also-rans who sound exactly like him." People magazine wrote that "the title of Joe's latest CD seems to attest to his singular abilities as a loveman. But on these slow jams and hip-hoppish midtempo numbers he doesn't sound much different from fellow R&B Romeos like R. Kelly ("Go Hard"), Brian McKnight ("Feel for You") and Usher ("Let's Just Do It")." The magazine rated the album two out of four stars. DJ Booth gave it four spins.

Commercial performance
Following its release, it debuted at number two on the US Billboard 200 and on top of the Top R&B/Hip Hop Albums chart, selling about 98,000 copies in its first week. It marked his highest-charting album since My Name Is Joe, which reached the same position of both charts. As of July 11, 2007, it has sold 224,823 copies in the United States.

Track listing

Notes
  signifies a co-producer

Sampling credits
 "Get to Know Me" samples from "You're Da Man" by Nas and "Sugar Man" by Sixto Rodriguez.
 "Just Relax" contains samples from "Electric Relaxation" by A Tribe Called Quest & "Mystic Brew" by Ronald Foster.
 "Love Is Just a Game" samples from "I Do" by Boyz II Men.

Charts

Weekly charts

Year-end charts

References

Joe (singer) albums
2007 albums
Jive Records albums
Albums produced by Tim & Bob
Albums produced by Bryan-Michael Cox
Albums produced by Sean Garrett
Albums produced by Cool & Dre
Albums produced by Stargate
Albums produced by the Underdogs (production team)